Dame Elizabeth Anne Griffiths  (2 November 1932 – 3 March 2017)  was a British librarian and archivist. She served as the personal archivist of Prince Philip.

She was educated at St Leonard's School in St Andrews, and worked as a Lady Clerk in the Office of The Duke of Edinburgh from 1952 to 1960. She returned to his office in 1983 and served as the Librarian and Archivist until 2017.

References

1932 births
2017 deaths
British archivists
British librarians
British women librarians
Dames Commander of the Royal Victorian Order
People educated at St Leonards School